Podenzana is a comune (municipality) in the Province of Massa and Carrara in the Italian region Tuscany, located about  northwest of Florence and about  northwest of Massa.

Podenzana borders the following municipalities: Aulla, Bolano, Calice al Cornoviglio, Follo, Licciana Nardi, Tresana.

Demographics

References

Cities and towns in Tuscany